The Volkswagen C Coupe GTE is a concept automobile first shown in April 2015 at Auto Shanghai. The four-door saloon is a plug-in hybrid, powered by a 2.0L turbocharged gasoline engine coupled with an electric motor, and was intended to preview an upcoming car for the Chinese market, positioned between the Passat and the Phaeton models. An updated version of the C Coupe GTE has been produced by SAIC Volkswagen and sold exclusively in China as the Phideon starting in July 2016.

Design
Klaus Bischoff, head of design for Volkswagen, stated the C Coupe GTE "very clearly shows the new 'face' of top Volkswagen sedans for the first time" with themes that would be used for future Volkswagen premium sedans, including sharp edges and horizontal lines to emphasize the car's length and width. Walter de Silva added "The new rear-end design that is oriented to the classic two-door 'coupé' has given [sedans] more personality. The Volkswagen designers have integrated this stylistic element into the very dynamic design of the C Coupé GTE saloon; they have developed a striking front end and given the vehicle its own authentic character. They have created a model that appeals to Chinese customers, who always follow the trends of European car design with great interest."

The concept C Coupe GTE was painted gold in a finish named "Golden Atmosphere" as a nod to its intended Chinese market; there were no plans to market the car in Europe or America.

Performance
The drivetrain is largely identical to the Audi A6L e-tron.

Production

The Volkswagen Phideon was introduced at Geneva in March 2016, and went on sale in China later that year, using conventional (gasoline-only) powertrains, although a plug-in hybrid variant was anticipated. The styling and dimensions of the Phideon closely followed the C Coupe GTE.

See also
The 2015 series of Volkswagen GTE concept cars, including:
 Volkswagen Cross Coupe GTE Concept (debuted at Detroit, Jan 2015)
 Volkswagen Sport Coupe Concept GTE (debuted at Geneva, Mar 2015)

References

External links

Cars introduced in 2015
C Coupe GTE